Piero Schivazappa (born  14 April 1935) is an Italian film and television director and screenwriter.

Life and career 
Born in Colorno, Schivazappa entered the film industry in 1959 as an assistant director, collaborating with Valerio Zurlini, Mario Monicelli and  Carlo Lizzani, among others. In 1963, he started collaborating with RAI for news reports and documentaries.

Schivazappa made his feature film debut in 1969, with the controversial BDSM-themed The Laughing Woman, which at the time had many problems with censorship. Following the success of his 1973 miniseries Vino e pane, in the following years he focused on television films and TV-series.

Personal life 
Schivazappa is married to actress Scilla Gabel.

Selected filmography 

 L'Odissea (TV, 1968)
 The Laughing Woman (1969)
 Una sera c'incontrammo (1975)
 Dov'è Anna? (TV, 1976)
 Lady of the Night (1986)
 An American Love (TV, 1994)

References

External links 
 

1935 births
Living people
Italian film directors
Italian television directors
Italian screenwriters
Italian male screenwriters
People from the Province of Parma
20th-century Italian people